Gowerton is a large village and community, about  north west of Swansea city centre, Wales. Gowerton is often known as the gateway to the Gower Peninsula. Gowerton's original name was Ffosfelin. The village falls within the Gowerton electoral ward of the City and County of Swansea Council, which elects one councillor. The community had a population of 5,212. and the built-up area with Waunarlwydd 8,183.

In 1980, the Welsh National Eisteddfod (named after Dyffryn Lliw, see below) was held at the Elba sports complex in the village. The Eisteddfod stone (Gorsedd stones) is located on the roundabout (grid ref. 585966) on the B4295 road to Penclawdd.

Geography
Nearby villages/towns are Penclawdd (west), Three Crosses and Dunvant (south), Waunarlwydd (east, contiguous with Gowerton), Gorseinon (north) and Loughor (north-west).

From 1974 to 1966, Gowerton was part of the district of Lliw Valley (Dyffryn Lliw) within West Glamorgan.

People from Gowerton are often referred to as "starch". When the local area processed steel for export, the steel owners and white collar workers lived in the Gowerton area; hence the name "starch". On the other hand, many of the manual workers resided in neighbouring Penclawdd and are known by the affectionate term "donks".

Gowerton is twinned with La Gacilly in Brittany, France.

Politics
Gowerton elects a community council of thirteen members in two wards: East and West.

Education
Gowerton has three schools: Gowerton Primary school , Gowerton Comprehensive School and Ysgol Gyfun Gŵyr (Welsh medium comprehensive school).

Religion
Gowerton once had five church or chapel buildings: St John's Church (built 1882), Tabernacl (opened 1893) Temple United Reformed Church (opened 1888), Bethel (opened 1873) and Bethania (opened 1891). However, only two, St John's Church and Temple URC, still remain. Bethel has lain in ruins for two decades and both Tabernacl and Bethania have been demolished.

Transport
Bus services are provided by First Cymru and NAT. These depart Gowerton from Hill Street or Sterry Road.

First Cymru provide a half-hourly service (no. 16) through the village to Swansea and Gorseinon.

Gowerton railway station is on the West Wales Line, between Swansea and Llanelli. Gowerton once had two railway stations, but today only one remains. This was made single-track in 1986. Work began in November 2012 to restore the double track to Gowerton by mid-2013, this has now been completed.

Sport
The local rugby club is Gowerton RFC.

Gowerton's Elba Sports Complex is home to Swansea Senior League Second Division, Gowerton FC.

Gowerton has a golf range and a nine-hole, par 3 golf course.

See also
Villages in Gower

References

External links
Gowerton local history
Gowerton primary school

Communities in Swansea
Districts of Swansea
Villages in Swansea
Swansea Bay (region)